Emil August Geiss (March 20, 1867 – October 4, 1911) was an American professional baseball player who was a pitcher and infielder for one season in Major League Baseball. He appeared in three games for the  Chicago White Stockings; one as a pitcher, one at first base, and one at second base.

References

External links

Retrosheet

1867 births
1911 deaths
Major League Baseball pitchers
Major League Baseball infielders
Chicago White Stockings players
19th-century baseball players
Pueblo Pastimes players
London Tecumsehs (baseball) players
Bloomington (minor league baseball) players
Ottumwa (minor league baseball) players
Baseball players from Chicago